Teena Records was a record label founded by R&B duo Ike & Tina Turner in 1963. Ike Turner named the label after his wife Tina Turner. Records on Teena were distributed by CIRCA distributing firm. CIRCA (Consolidated International Record Company of America) was formed in 1962 to operate as a releasing company for independent labels by working with various distributors around the US.

While the Ike & Tina Turner Revue were constantly on the road performing, Ike Turner found time to record the artist in his band. Turner used this label to release singles by vocalist within the Revue, notably the Ikettes. He wrote and produced all the songs on the label. The second single, "Prisoner in Love" by the Ikettes, was changed to "No Bail in This Jail" in order to avoid confusion with "Prisoner of Love" by James Brown. "No Bail In This Jail (Prisoner In Love)" reached #126 on Billboard's Bubbling Under The Hot 100.

Discography

See also 

 Sonja Records
 Innis Records
 Sony Records
 Prann Records
 List of record labels

References 

American record labels
Rhythm and blues record labels
Pop record labels
Ike Turner
Ike & Tina Turner
Record labels established in 1963
Vanity record labels
Defunct record labels of the United States